Baron Balthasar von Campenhausen (5 January 1772 – 11 September 1823) was a Baltic German statesman who held the ranks of Privy Councilor and Chamberlain in the Russian Empire.

Personal life

Family 
Balthasar Freiherr von Campenhausen was born in 1772, in Lenzenhof, into a Baltic German noble family Campenhausen residing in the province of Livonia (then part of Imperial Russia, now Latvia and Estonia). The ancestors of Balthasar Campenhausen served Swedish and Russian sovereigns.

Education 
He studied in the universities of Leipzig, Wittenberg and Göttingen that he graduated with a thesis Entwürfe zu physikalischen Völker-, Religions— und Kulturkarten des russischen Reiches at the Royal Scientific Society.

Career 
Balthasar Campenhausen served as ambassador to Poland and Sweden, headed reorganization of the commercial school and medical surgery institution in Saint Petersburg and during the rule of Alexander I of Russia, he was appointed director of the 3rd Department (medical dept.) at the Russian Ministry of Internal Affairs. In 1802, Russian Emperor Alexander I of Russia sent Campenhausen to the South Russian seaports on Black and Azov Sea to see the reasons for poor trade development and to provide quarantine conditions in the South of Russia during the outbreak of bubonic plague in Turkey and Persia.

In 1805, Balthasar von Campenhausen was appointed Governor of Taganrog, where he created the Taganrog Customs district; the new slope to the haven; new stone storehouses for goods; started construction of coasting vessels for transportation of goods to other Russian ports on Black and Azov Seas; inaugurated the navigation school, the commercial gymnasium and the commercial court; opened the first drugstore and introduced the posts of the city doctor and city midwife; opened the construction and building committee that planned the future city architectural development; introduced oil lighting in the streets; started the paving and greening of the streets; in April 1806 founded the City Park. Two streets in Taganrog were later named after Campenhausen: Bolshoy Campenhausenskiy (now: Comsomolskiy) and Malo-Campenhausenskiy (now: Spartakovskiy).

In 1809, Campenhausen was named the State Treasurer, Privy Councilor in 1810,  member of the State Council and senator in 1811, and Minister of Internal Affairs in 1823. He died in Saint Petersburg in 1823.

Bibliography
Versuch einer geographisch-statistischen Beschreibung der Statthalterschaften des russischen Reichs. I. Statthalterschaft Olouez (Göttingen, 1792);
Elemente des russischen Staatsrechts, oder Hauptzüge der Grundverfassung des russischen Kaiserthums (Göttingen, 1792);
Auswahl topographischer Merkwürdigkeiten des St. Peterburgischen Gouvernements (Riga, 1797);
Liefländisches Magazin, oder Sammlung publicistisch-statistischer Materialien zur Kenntniss der Verfassung und Statistik von Liefland (Gota, 1803);
Genealogisch-chronologische Geschichte des allerdurchlauchtigsten Hauses Romanow und seines vorälterlichen Stammhauses (Leipzig, 1805).

References 

1772 births
1823 deaths
People from Pārgauja Municipality
People from the Governorate of Livonia
Baltic-German people
Russian nobility
Swedish nobility
Politicians of the Russian Empire
Governors of Taganrog